Bridge in Lykens Township No. 2 is a historic single span stone arch bridge spanning a tributary of Pine Creek at Lykens Township, Dauphin County, Pennsylvania. It was built in 1872, and has a camelback shape. The property measures 25 feet long by 25 feet wide.  It is built of coursed ashlar.

It was added to the National Register of Historic Places in 1988.

References

Road bridges on the National Register of Historic Places in Pennsylvania
Bridges completed in 1872
Bridges in Dauphin County, Pennsylvania
National Register of Historic Places in Dauphin County, Pennsylvania
Stone arch bridges in the United States